The 2017 Brazilian Mixed Doubles Curling Championship (in Portuguese: 2017 Campeonato Brasileiro de Curling de Duplas Mistas) were held from November 15 to 19, 2017 at the Royal Canadian Curling Club in Toronto, Ontario. Tournament were held in 3rd time.

Teams

Round robin

Playoffs

Page playoffs
Friday, November 17, 1:00 pm

1 vs 2

3 vs 4

Semifinal
Saturday, November 18, 10:00 am

Final
Saturday, November 18, 5:00 pm

Final standings

References

Brazilian Mixed Doubles Curling Championship
Curling in British Columbia
Curling in Brazil
Brazilian Mixed Doubles Curling Championship
Brazilian Mixed Doubles Curling Championship